The Szolnok Gallery is a gallery hosting art exhibitions in the former Szolnok Synagogue building in Szolnok in central Hungary.

History 

The synagogue in Szolnok was designed by Lipót Baumhorn and was completed in 1898. The site is surrounded by an ornate fence, and the synagogue has a winter hall and offices. The eclectic building, considered by some to be exaggerated, was the third synagogue of Baumhorn and bears his creative Italian study tour and the influence of Ödön Lechner. Above the central floor plan was a dome, which, together with its ornaments, is a direct descendant of the style of the Budapest Museum of Applied Arts. The four facades, on the other hand, contain elements of Italian Gothic architecture. The mass of the exterior and the richness of the interior were in harmony. The building has an external dimension of 19.83x34.11 meters and a square interior space of 17.95x17.85 meters. The dome is underpinned by columnar columns and the interior is surrounded by a female gallery. In front of the eastern wall, the pedestal and the ornately shaped crib were once separated by a cast-iron fence.

Sources 
 (szerk.) Gerő László: Magyarországi zsinagógák, Műszaki Könyvkiadó, Budapest, 1989, 185. o.

Synagogues in Hungary